Roger Davis may refer to:
Roger Davis (film actor) (1884–1980), American actor
Roger Davis (television actor) (born 1939), American actor in television series Dark Shadows and Alias Smith and Jones
Roger Davis (cricketer) (born 1946), former county cricketer who played for Glamorgan
Roger Davis (Pennsylvania politician) (1762–1815), member of the U.S. House of Representatives from Pennsylvania
Roger Davis (American football) (born 1938), former American football player
Roger Davis, a character from Rent (musical)
Roger K. Davis, prison guard and candidate in the United States House of Representatives elections in Illinois, 2010
Roger Davis, Marengo County, Alabama, Sheriff, imprisoned for corruption

See also
Roger Davies (disambiguation)